Ndombe Opetum (March 3, 1944 – May 24, 2012), popularly known as Pepe Ndombe, was an Odemba recording artist, composer and vocalist, in the Democratic Republic of the Congo (DRC). He was once a member of the seminal soukous band TPOK Jazz which dominated the Congolese music scene from the 1960s through the 1980s.

Music career with TPOK Jazz
Ndombe Opetum was the lead vocalist for Afrisa International, prior to joining TPOK Jazz, in the mid 1970s, after Sam Mangwana had left the band. He came over to TPOK Jazz with horn player Empopo Loway, and he stayed with the band until it split up in December 1993, four years after the death of founder François Luambo Makiadi. Contemporary band members at the time included vocalists: Wuta Mayi, Michel Boyibanda, Josky Kiambukuta and Youlou Mabiala, and rhythm guitarist Simaro Lutumba and solo guitarist Franco himself.

Ndombe Opetum is credited with composing the following songs for the band, among others:
 Voyage na Bandundu
 Mawe
 Mabe Yo Mabe – in 1977
 Coupe du Monde – in 1979
 Youyou – in 1980
 Nayebi Ndenge Bakolela Ngai – in 1982
 Angela – in 1989
 Tawaba – in 1989

Music career post TPOK Jazz
Following the death of Franco in 1989, TPOK Jazz continued to play together for four years. Simarro would take care of the musicians and the family would take care of the lawyers, record labels and other technical stakeholders. The musicians would share 70% of receipts, while the Franco family would keep 30% of all receipts. However, differences developed between the musicians and the Franco family and the band split up in December 1993. Ndombe Opetum, together with Simaro Lutumba, Josky Kiambukuta and about thirty former TPOK Jazz members. He was also a founding member of the band Bana OK in January 1994  and was a member of the band up until his death in May 2012.

Personal life
Pepe Ndombe Opetum was born in Bandundu Province in what was then known as the Belgian Congo in 1944. He was educated in Leopoldville (now Kinshasa). He was married and was the father of nine children. His fifth offspring is a son, born in Kinshasa on 3 March 1974, who is also a professional vocalist in the DRC. The young Ndombe calls himself Baby Ndombe or Baby Black, and has performed to large audiences in Africa, Europe and North America, targeting primarily the African Diaspora.

Death
Pepe Ndombe Opetum died of cardiac arrest on May 24, 2012, in Kinshasa, Democratic Republic of Congo. At the time of his death, his age was reported as 68 years old.

See also
 Franco Luambo Makiadi
 Sam Mangwana
 Josky Kiambukuta
 TPOK Jazz
 List of African musicians

References

External links
Overview of Legacy of Franco and TPOK Jazz
Lengthy Interview with Simaro Lutumba In 2002
 Photo of Ndombe Opetum, Radio Okapi]

Democratic Republic of the Congo musicians
1944 births
Soukous musicians
2012 deaths
People from Bandundu Province
TPOK Jazz members